This uniform polyhedron compound is a symmetric arrangement of 10 hexagonal prisms, aligned with the axes of three-fold rotational symmetry of an icosahedron.

Cartesian coordinates 
Cartesian coordinates for the vertices of this compound are all the cyclic permutations of

 (±, ±(τ−1−τ), ±(τ+τ−1))
 (±2, ±τ−1, ±τ)
 (±(1+), ±(1−τ), ±(1+τ−1))
 (±(τ−τ−1), ±, ±(τ−1+τ))
 (±(1−τ−1), ±(1−), ±(1+τ))

where τ = (1+)/2 is the golden ratio (sometimes written φ).

References 
.

Polyhedral compounds